The MEO Rip Curl Pro Portugal 2019 is an event in the 2019 World Surf League Men's and Women's Championship Tour. This year's event marks the return of the women's competition to Peniche after 8 years without it.

Brazilian surfer, Italo Ferreira was the men's winner becoming the first ever back-to-back winner as he won the event in 2018. He also ascended to the top spot of the Men's Championship Tour leaderboard surpassing the previous yellow jersey carrier, the world champion Gabriel Medina.

American surfer, Caroline Marks won the women's event and her second Championship Tour trophy of the year. The 17-year-old surfer defeated world number two, Lakey Peterson in the final.

Background 
The 11th edition of the event will be hosted in Peniche, Portugal from 16 to 28 October at the Supertubos beach in Peniche, Leiria, Portugal.

Italo Ferreira, from Brazil, is the defending champion as he won the competition in 2018.

Format

A new competition format was introduced for the 2019 Championship Tour. All 36 surfers take part in the Seeding Round. The top two surfers in each heat advance directly to the Round of 32, while the lowest-placed surfer in each heat enters the Elimination Round. In each of the four heats in the Elimination Round, the top two surfers advance to the Round of 32, while the lowest-placed surfer is eliminated from the competition. From the Round of 32 onwards, the competition follows a single elimination format, with the winner of each head-to-head heat advancing to the next round and the loser being eliminated.

Competition

Men's tournament

Seeding Round

Elimination round

Round of 32

Round of 16

Quarterfinals

Semifinals

Final

Women's tournament

Seeding Round

Elimination round

Round of 16

Quarterfinals

Semifinals

Final

References

External links
 World Surf League

Rip Curl Pro Portugal
2019 World Surf League
2019 in Portuguese sport
October 2019 sports events in Portugal